Tai Lam Liu is a village in the Siu Lek Yuen area of Sha Tin District, Hong Kong.

Administration
Tai Lam Liu is a recognized village under the New Territories Small House Policy. It is one of the villages represented within the Sha Tin Rural Committee. For electoral purposes, Tai Lam Liu is part of the Kwong Hong constituency, which was formerly represented by Ricardo Liao Pak-hong until July 2021.

History
At the time of the 1911 census, the population of Tai Lam Liu was 57. The number of males was 23.

References

External links

 Delineation of area of existing village Tai Lam Liu (Sha Tin) for election of resident representative (2019 to 2022)

Villages in Sha Tin District, Hong Kong
Siu Lek Yuen